Ravi Behl (born 10 May 1966) is an Indian actor and  television producer belonging to Behl family of Hindi films. He is better known for the 1991 film Narsimha and co-host of dance show Boogie Woogie, that he co-produced with Naved Jaffery for Sony television. He debuted in movies in 1980 with film Morchha, followed by Inteha in 1984.

Early and personal life 

He is a son of film producer Shyam Behl. His sister Geeta Behl is an actress who did roles in movies such as Main Tulsi Tere Aangan Ki (1968), Meraa Dost Meraa Dushman (1984), Do Premee (1980) and Zamaane Ko Dikhana Hai (1981). Ravi's father produced movies, such as Duniya (1968) starring Dev Anand and Vyjayanthimala, and The Gold Medal (1969) starring Jeetendra, Rakhee Gulzar, and Shatrughan Sinha.

Behl, who remains unmarried, had said in an interview, "A lot of people are surprised that I’m still unmarried. It’s not that I haven’t tried. I was seeing a girl for a long time but unfortunately, our relationship didn’t blossom into marriage. We had our differences."

Professional work
Ravi made his acting debut with Raj Babbar in film Inteha in 1984. He worked in popular films, such as Narsimha with (1991) with Sunny Deol and Urmila Matondkar, Dalaal (1993) with Mithun Chakraborty and Ayesha Jhulka; Agni Sakshi (1996) with Jackie Shroff, Nana Patekar and Manisha Koirala; and Ghulam-E-Mustafa (1997) with Nana Patekar and Raveena Tandon. He also acted in a British TV mini series based on the novel The Far Pavilions.

After his career in movies fade he became the co-producer and host of Boogie Woogie (1996-2014) an Indian Television dance show. Ravi, who was once in financial trouble, Tellychakkar, found financial security through his work in television.

Filmography 
 Morchha (1980), acting debut
 Inteha (1984)
 Avinash (1986)
 Narsimha (1991),Ravi Rastogi  first break as lead pair
 Boy Friend (1993)
 Dalaal (1993)
 Pyar Ka Rog (1994)
 The Far Pavilions British TV mini series (1994)
 Meri Mohabbat Mera Naseeba (1995)
 Agni Sakshi (1996)
 Ghulam-E-Mustafa (1997)
 Boogie Woogie (TV series) (1997-2014)
 Sarfarosh-E-Hind (1999)
 Salaam Bacche (2007)

Web series
 The Night Manager

See also
 List of Hindi film families

References

External links

Indian male film actors
Male actors in Hindi cinema
Living people
Indian television producers
Male actors from Mumbai
Indian television presenters
1966 births